The twentieth season of Family Guy aired on Fox from September 26, 2021, to May 22, 2022. the twentieth season aired as apart of the show's 20th anniversary.

The series follows the dysfunctional Griffin family, consisting of father Peter, mother Lois, daughter Meg, son Chris, baby Stewie, and the family dog Brian, who reside in their hometown of Quahog.

During this season, the Griffin men spend a day with Stewie's rival Doug (LASIK Instinct), Peter has a secret meal affair with Bonnie (Cootie & The Blowhard), the Griffins must cover the death of a pizza delivery man and deliver pizzas to the rest of Quahog (The Lois Quagmire), Lois and Carter attend the funeral of Lois' old babysitter (Peterschmidt Manor), Meg becomes a getaway driver and dates a robber (Hard Boiled Meg), Stewie helps Chris put on a school play for Romeo + Juliet (The Jersey Bore), and Peter and Chris go on a road trip to Canada to prove the existence of Chris' girlfriend (Girlfriend, Eh?). This season also featured a cameo from Mike Judge, who reprised his role as Hank Hill from the American television series King of the Hill, who previously cameoed in Season 18 as Beavis and Butt-Head.

Season twenty premiered the run of the nineteenth production season, which is executive produced by Seth MacFarlane, Alec Sulkin, Richard Appel, Steve Callaghan, Danny Smith, Kara Vallow, Mark Hentemann, Tom Devanney, and Patrick Meighan. Sulkin and Appel returned as the series' showrunners.

The season premiered on ITV2 (UK) Monday 8th August 2022.

Production
On September 23, 2020, Fox announced that Family Guy had been renewed for a twentieth and twenty-first season, ensuring that the series would last another two years.

This season also marks the first full season of the series in which Cleveland Brown is voiced by Arif Zahir, following Mike Henry's departure from the role. Henry continues to voice Herbert and other characters. Before the premiere, Henry sent a video on Twitter saying that he was "handing the torch" onto Zahir and said a farewell message in Cleveland's voice.

Starting with "Rock Hard", long-time recurring actor Patrick Warburton was promoted to the main cast.

20th anniversary
Fox celebrated the twentieth season with a special digital panel, with a promotional trailer unveiled during the San Diego Comic-Con 2021 Virtual Convention, teasing clips from the season. In commemoration, FXX set a near full series marathon of all 19 seasons of the show, running from December 25, 2021 to January 2, 2022. A promotional PSA short made to promote COVID-19 vaccines was released on September 21, 2021. MacFarlane himself remarked on the show's milestone.
In addition, sweepstakes were held by TBS where entrees had a chance to win T-shirts, Mugs and Blankets. as well as a re-release of the book, "Family Guy: An Illustrated History".

Release
The season premiered on September 26, 2021, airing on Sundays as part of Fox's Animation Domination programming block, along with The Simpsons, Bob's Burgers, Duncanville and The Great North. In the UK, the season started airing new episodes every Wednesday on Disney+ through its Star hub starting on November 3. In Australia new episodes air weekly on Disney+ simultaneously with 7 Mate.

Critical reception
John Schwarz with Bubbleblabber.com gave the season a positive review. Stating "I think Family Guy season 20 is a bit of a “rebuilding year” for the show. For starters, the series introduced not just the aforementioned Zahir doing an awesome job as the new voice of Cleveland, but also the likes of Chris Parnell, Peter Macon, Jay Pharoah, and Patton Oswalt have all portrayed new characters that appear to be on the road to that of “recurring” status, and all of whom play really funny and fresh new characters."

Though he criticized the focus on anthology episodes, mainly 'Rock Hard' and 'HBO-No'. But praised the risks taken in the episode 'First Blood' and concluded "Parnell and Zahir are the types of ingredients that can really help put new logs on this fire to keep it warm, and we await if this franchise has the goods to go another 20 seasons."

Episodes

References

Family Guy seasons
2021 American television seasons
2022 American television seasons